Sally Ante Lee is the mayor of Sorsogon City in the Philippines. She is Sorsogon's first woman mayor of the said city and also first woman governor of Sorsogon Province. Lee is the wife of Governor Raul R. Lee and mayoress of Sorsogon City since 2000.

Biography
Ally Velasquez Ante Lee was born on July 26, 1942 in Lapog, Ilocos Sur. She then moved to Sorsogon in 1966. Lee is a certified public accountant in profession.

Career

Lee has been involved in her community specially in evangelization and social services. She has been exposed in politics since 1970s because of her husband.

On September 8, 2009, the Japan International Cooperation Agency (JICA) carried out the Japan Overseas Cooperation Volunteer (JOCV) Program Seminar in Sorsogon City, Sorsogon.

References 

Living people
1942 births
Governors of Sorsogon
Mayors of places in Sorsogon
Women mayors of places in the Philippines
People from Sorsogon
People from Ilocos Sur
Women provincial governors of the Philippines